Fire in the Breeze is the debut Compilation album by the Australian band Kisschasy, released on 20 November 2004 in Japan. Fire in the Breeze was released in Japan before Kisschasy toured in 2004. Fire in the Breeze compiles Kisschasy's first two eps: Darkside / Stay Awake and Cara Sposa.

Track listing

Release history

Kisschasy albums
2004 compilation albums